Events from the year 1972 in France.

Incumbents
 President: Georges Pompidou 
 Prime Minister: Jacques Chaban-Delmas (until 5 July), Pierre Messmer (starting 6 July)

Events
January – Launch of the Renault 5, one of the world's first small hatchbacks.
23 April – French European Economic Community enlargement referendum, voters approved the accession of the United Kingdom, Denmark, Ireland, and Norway to the EEC.
16 June – 108 die as two passenger trains hit debris of a collapsed railway tunnel near Soissons.
1 July – Canadian ketch Vega, flying the Greenpeace III banner, collides with the French naval minesweeper La Paimpolaise while in international waters to protest French nuclear weapon tests in the South Pacific.
5 July – President Pompidou dismisses prime minister Chaban-Delmas following rumours of financial misdoing.
October – The Peugeot 104, the smallest four-door car in the world, is launched.
28 October – The first flight of the Airbus A300, the first airliner built by Airbus.

Sport
1 July – Tour de France begins.
22 July – Tour de France ends, won by Eddy Merckx of Belgium.

Births

January to March
1 January – Lilian Thuram, international soccer player.
4 January – Sylvain Deplace, soccer player.
9 January – Frédéric Bessy, cyclist.
10 January – Gilles Trehin, artist and author.
17 January – Olivier Sourgens, rugby union player.
18 January – Bruno Alicarte, soccer player.
22 January – Yves Demaria, motocross racer.
8 February – Mathieu Verschuère, soccer player.
17 February – Philippe Candeloro, figure skater.
22 February – Laurence Leboucher, mountain bike and cyclo-cross racer.
3 March – Jacques Rémy, soccer player.
8 March – Nicolas Fargues, novelist.
12 March – Laurent Dufresne, soccer player.
22 March
Jocelyn Gourvennec, soccer player.
Christophe Revault, soccer player.
23 March – Judith Godrèche, actress and author.
24 March – Christophe Dugarry, soccer player.
25 March – Sébastien Flute, archer and Olympic gold medallist.
27 March – Agathe de La Fontaine, actress.
29 March – Cédric Lécluse, soccer player.

April to June
2 April – Fabrice Bry, volleyball player.
3 April – Sandrine Testud, tennis player.
21 April – Gwendal Peizerat, ice dancer.
29 April – Anne-Sophie Lapix, journalist and television presenter.
April – Olivier Doleuze, jockey.
5 May – Laurent Capet, volleyball player.
6 May – Sébastien Amiez, alpine skier.
15 May – David Charvet, actor.
20 May – Christophe Dominici, international rugby union player (died 2020).
22 May – Nathalie Teppe, heptathlete.
28 May – Jocelyn Blanchard, soccer player.
8 June – Frédéric Esther, boxer.
17 June – Antoine Albeau, windsurfer.
19 June – Jean Dujardin, comedian.
23 June – Zinedine Zidane, international soccer player.
28 June – Samir Amirèche, soccer player.

July to September
5 July 
David Benyamine, tennis, billiards and poker player.
Gilles Lellouche, actor
6 July
Fabrice Colin, author.
Laurent Gaudé, writer.
10 July – Stéphane Carnot, soccer player.
14 July – Loïc Le Meur, entrepreneur and blogger.
28 July – Walter Bénéteau, cyclist.
29 July – Amaria Pauline , dancer 
5 August – Yann Lachuer, soccer player.
7 August – Ghislain Lemaire, judoka.
13 August – Michael Sinterniklaas, French-born American voice actor
19 August – Fabien Cool, soccer player.
20 August – Olivier Guégan, soccer player.
1 September – Vincent Riou, sailor.
13 September – Olivier Echouafni, soccer player.
19 September – Sébastien Maté, soccer player.
21 September – Olivia Bonamy, actress.

October to December
5 October – Jean-Sebastien Bax, soccer player.
15 October – Mathieu Demy, actor.
19 October – Fabien Leclercq, soccer player.
24 October – Frédéric Déhu, soccer player.
25 October – Esther Duflo, economist.
11 November – Stéphane Cassard, soccer player.
16 November – Patricia Meunier-Lebouc, golfer.
20 November
Jérôme Alonzo, soccer player.
Corinne Niogret, biathlete and Olympic medallist.
22 November – Olivier Brouzet, rugby union player.
27 November – Stéphane Pocrain, television journalist.
3 December – Laurent Roux, cyclist.
4 December – Franck Tournaire, international rugby union player.
5 December
Stéphane Barthe, racing cyclist
Antoine Préget, soccer player.
6 December – Cyrille Pouget, soccer player.
13 December – Claude-Arnaud Rivenet, soccer player.
19 December – Cédric Soulette, rugby union player.
22 December – Vanessa Paradis, singer and actress.
24 December – Richard Dutruel, soccer player.
26 December – Jérôme Le Banner, kickboxer and K-1 practitioner.
31 December – Grégory Coupet, international soccer player.

Full date unknown
Jules de Balincourt, painter.
Fabrice Bellard, computer programmer.
Vanessa Duriès, novelist (died 1993).
Sylvain Guillot, jockey.

Deaths

January to March
1 January – Maurice Chevalier, actor and singer (born 1888).
6 January – Xavier Vallat, politician and Commissioner-General for Jewish Questions in Vichy France (born 1891).
19 January – Suzanne Malherbe, illustrator and designer (born 1892).
20 January – Jean Casadesus, classical pianist (born 1927).
29 January – Claire Ferchaud, religious mystic (born 1896)
17 February – Youenn Drezen, Breton nationalist writer and activist (born 1899).
21 February
Marie Dubas, music-hall singer and comedian (born 1894).
Eugène Tisserant, cardinal (born 1884).
4 March – Maurice Diot, cyclist (born 1922).
17 March – Adolphe Bousquet, rugby union player (born 1899).
28 March 
Joseph Paul-Boncour, politician (born 1873).
Alice Pruvot-Fol, malacologist (born 1873).

April to June
10 April – Henri de la Falaise, translator, film director and film producer (born 1898).
11 April – Maurice Cottenet, soccer player (born 1895).
26 April – Jacques de Bernonville, collaborationist and senior police officer in the Vichy regime (born 1897).
27 April – Lucien Sarti, drug trafficker and killer-for-hire (b. c1931).
5 May – Roger Courtois, international soccer player (born 1912).
7 May 
Henri Diamant-Berger, screenwriter, film director and producer (born 1895).
Robert Lingat, academic scholar (born 1892).
28 May – Violette Leduc, author (born 1907).
5 June – Jean Moreau, politician (born 1888).
17 June – Marcel Deviq, engineer, businessman, and politician (born 1907).
29 June – Boby Lapointe, singer (born 1922).
30 June – Hervé Budes de Guébriant, engineer (born 1880).

July to September
7 July – Marcel-Frédéric Lubin-Lebrère, rugby union player (born 1891).
22 July – Max Aub, author, playwright and literary critic (born 1903).
14 August – Jules Romains, poet and writer (born 1885).
16 August – Pierre Brasseur, actor (born 1905).
21 August
Albert Achard, World War I flying ace (born 1894).
Yvonne Gall, operatic soprano (born 1885).
24 August – Lucien Rebatet, author, journalist and intellectual (born 1903).
14 September – Jean-Jacques Bernard, playwright (born 1888)
19 September – Robert Casadesus, pianist and composer (born 1899).
21 September – Henry de Montherlant, essayist, novelist and playwright (born 1896).
28 September – Maurice Thiriet, composer (born 1906).

October to December
29 October – Julien Maitron, cyclist (born 1881).
18 November – André Héléna, writer (born 1919).
27 November – Robert Schurrer, athlete and Olympic medallist (born 1890).
13 December – René Mayer, politician and Prime Minister of France (born 1895).
15 December – François Bourbotte, soccer player (born 1913).

See also
 List of French films of 1972

References

1970s in France